Bonheur ASA is a publicly traded Norwegian holding company headquartered in Oslo. The company is listed on Oslo Stock Exchange and has interests in the energy, real estate, shipping and media sectors.

Bonheur is controlled by  Fred. Olsen & Co., the private investment vehicle of Norwegian billionaire Anette S. Olsen. In May 2016 Bonheur merged with another Olsen family associated holding company Ganger Rolf ASA, giving Fred. Olsen & Co. a 49.53% ownership stake in the consolidated company.

Investments

References

Holding companies of Norway
Holding companies established in 1897
Fred. Olsen & Co.
Companies listed on the Oslo Stock Exchange
Norwegian companies established in 1897